Kisan may be:
The Kisan dialect of the Kurux language
The Kisan dialect of the Maithili language
The Nepalese name of the Sadri language